The Bacon Family Homestead is a  property in Mitchell County, Georgia which was listed on the National Register of Historic Places in 1983.

It is associated with Robert J. Bacon, Jr. (1880-1946), who helped establish Baconton's first "crackery", a pecan shelling plant, in 1919.

The homestead includes an early twentieth century rustic style house, a historic outbuilding, locations of several former outbuildings, historic landscape features, and a pecan grove on a narrow property that extends to the Flint River.  The house is a one-story with unpainted board and batten siding.  Carpentry detailing includes eaves that are boxed and returned.

References

Farms on the National Register of Historic Places in Georgia (U.S. state)
Houses completed in 1913
National Register of Historic Places in Mitchell County, Georgia